Schneeberger is a surname. Notable people with the surname include:

 Hansheinz Schneeberger (1926–2019), Swiss violinist
 John Schneeberger (born 1961), Canadian physician
 Josef Schneeberger (1919–1989), Austrian cross country skier
 Marc Schneeberger (born 1981), a Swiss sprinter
 Rosina Schneeberger (born 1994), Austrian skier
 Sébastien Schneeberger (born 1973), Swiss-Canadian politician

See also 

 Schneeberg, Saxony

Surnames of German origin
Surnames of Swiss origin
German-language surnames